This is a list of social nudity places in Oceania for recreation. It includes free beaches (or clothing-optional beaches or nude beaches), swimming holes and lakes and some naturist resorts. It does not include resorts that allow women to sunbathe top-free, or where indigenous peoples maintain their customs regarding clothing.

Australia

Australian Capital Territory
Kambah Pool

New South Wales 
The following beaches and resorts in New South Wales are legally nudist or clothing optional:

 Arcadia
 Armands Beach, Bermagui, Sapphire Coast
 Birdie Beach, Lake Munmorah
 Near Byron Bay, the beach adjacent to the Tyagarah Nature Reserve, south of the picnic area at the end of Grays Lane, has been designated a ‘clothes optional beach’ (nudist beach) by Byron Shire Council.
 BB at Byron Bay Luxury Naturist Retreat (Affiliated ANF)
 Coast and Valley Nudists
 Lady Bay Beach, Watsons Bay, Sydney Harbour (name changed in 1977 from Lady Jane Beach)
 Cobblers Beach, Mosman, Sydney Harbour
 Kiata Country Club Sydney 
 Naturi Club
 Obelisk Beach, Mosman, Sydney Harbour
 River Island Nature Retreat
 Rosco Club Incorporated
 Samurai Beach, One Mile
 Twin Falls Naturist Retreat | url = https://www.twin-falls.com |
 Werrong Beach, Royal National Park
 Wrenbrook

The following beaches are regularly used by naturists, but nude bathing may not be legally protected:

 Belongil Beach, Byron Bay
 Tyagarah Beach {legal}, Byron Bay
 Kings Beach, Broken Head, near Byron Bay
 Curracurrang, Royal National Park
 Flint and Steel Beach, Ku-ring-gai Chase National Park
 Little Congwong Beach, La Perouse
 Little Jibbon Beach, Royal National Park
 Marley Beach, Royal National Park
 Shelley Beach, Royal National Park
 Seven Mile Beach, Seven Mile Beach National Park
 Washaway Beach, Sydney Harbour National Park

Northern Territory 
 Casuarina Beach, Darwin

Queensland 
There is no legal nude beach in Queensland.  This was restated in April 2016 following another petition to the Labor State Government who said they would not approve a nudist beach. Police Minister Bill Byrne on May 2, 2016 rejected two attempts - a paper petition with 527 signatures and an online petition bearing 946 names - to create a "clothing optional beach".  Petitioners wanted a beach "for the recreational use of those who wish to sunbathe or swim nude without the fear of prosecution".  Minister Byrne said the State's Public Safety Business Agency advised Queensland's wilful exposure laws were designed to protect citizens and keep them safe.. "As such, I can advise that the Queensland government has no plans to change the current legislation dealing with wilful exposure, therefore the designation of a clothing optional beach is not supported at this time."

Queensland is the only mainland state in Australia that has no legal nude beaches.

Current unofficial beaches are:
 Alexandria Bay (known as "A Bay") near Noosa is a popular spot with nudists and arguably the most tolerated nude beach.
 Bribie Island - Remote beaches on Bribie were once popular with nudists, though Moreton Bay rangers as well as police now regularly patrol this remote island.
 Cow Bay, two hours north of Cairns within the Daintree Rainforest.

The following resorts are naturist or clothing optional:
 Balkaz 
 Cooroy Colony
 Eagles View
 Elephant Rock
 Savannah Park
 Tranquility
 Whiptail
 Pacific sun Friends Donybrooke
 Nakedstay Sunshine coast Hinterland

South Australia 
The following beaches in South Australia are used by nudists:

 Maslin Beach
 Ocean Beach near Robe
 Pelican Point, Barmera
 Murrippi Beach, near Whyalla
 Point Drummond, Eyre Peninsula (not legal)
 Macs Beach, near Price on Yorke Peninsula. (Unofficial) Very isolated with miles of beach to be away from anyone.

Tasmania
Tasmania Police in February 2016 said that it was illegal to swim or be in a public place without appropriate attire and patrols at Seven Mile Beach would be increased in response to the complaints.

Nudists use the following beaches:

 7-mile Beach
 Bakers Beach 
 Green's Peninsula Beach
 Nude Beach – section of beach naturally secluded by a rocky outcrop, beyond the south-western end of Hinsby Beach, Taroona

Victoria 
Three of those beaches are legal clothes-optional beaches:

 Sunnyside North Beach, Mount Eliza, Port Philip Bay on the Mornington Peninsula
 Point Impossible Beach, Torquay, West Coast
 Southside Beach, near Bells Beach, West Coast

Previously listed as clothes-optional beach:
 Campbell's Cove, near Werribee South. Campbells Cove had clothing-optional status removed by Wyndham City Council in July 2016.

The following are not legal nudist beaches but are used by nudists:

 Cape Conran
 Cutlers Beach, Wonthaggi
 The Oaks, Inverloch

Western Australia 
The following are legal nudist beaches in Western Australia:

 North Swanbourne Beach
 Warnbro Beach, Rockingham 
 Mindalong Beach, Bunbury
 Mauritius Beach, Exmouth
 East Pretty Pool, Port Hedland
 Ten Mile Lagoon, Esperance

The following resort is Naturist:

 Sunseekers Nudist Club

The following beaches are used by naturists, but nude bathing may not be legally protected:

 Cable Beach, Broome
 Redgate Beach, Margaret River

New Zealand 

There is no law prohibiting nakedness in public. In cases of ‘public nakedness’ the police go to the Summary Offences Act 1981 and consider, S27 Obscene/Indecent exposure; S4 Offensive behaviour; or S4 Disorderly behaviour.

In 1991 an appeal to the High Court won and determined that the legal definition of 'offensive' was not met by mere nakedness, even in the presence of  children, on the grounds that a reasonable person would "regard the conduct... as inappropriate, unnecessary, and in bad taste, but not arousing feelings of anger, disgust, or outrage."  There had to be 'intent to offend'.  Public nudity on beaches is generally not enforceable. There have been a number of successful legal challenges to being naked in a public area, including cycling and running, so long as there was no intent to offend.

In 2012 a number of complaints regarding behavior at Auckland beaches led to warnings being issued by police at some which have a history of use by naturists. However, no official action was taken.

Beaches

North Island

Northland Region 
Maitai Bay, Karikari Peninsula
Rarawa Beach near Ngataki
Tapotupotu Bay
Uretiti Beach 
Waitata Bay, Russell

Auckland 
Fitzpatrick Bay 
Herne Bay
Karekare Beach
Ladies Bay, Saint Heliers
Little Palm Beach, Waiheke Island
O'Neills Beach
Orpheus Bay
St Leonards Beach, Takapuna
Pohutukawa Bay (Long Bay), North Shore

Coromandel Peninsula 
Opoutere Beach

Bay of Plenty 
Waihi Beach
Papamoa Beach, Tauranga

Taranaki 
Tapuae Beach, New Plymouth

Manawatū-Whanganui 
Ototoka Beach, Whanganui

Hawke's Bay Region 
Ocean Beach

Wellington 
Breaker Bay 
Peka Peka Beach, Kapiti Coast

South Island

Nelson 
Moturoa / Rabbit Island, Richmond
 Breakers Bay, Kaiteriteri

Westland District 
Barrytown Beach
Carters Beach
Lake Kaniere

Canterbury Region 
Ashworths Beach
Waikuku Beach
Woodend Beach, Woodend

Christchurch and Banks Peninsula 
Camp Bay
Hikuraki Bay
Spencer Park Beach
Taylors Mistake Beach 
Tumbledown Bay

Otago Region 
Homestead Bay, Lake Wanaka
Willsher Bay, Kākā Point

Dunedin 
Allans Beach 
Boulder Beach 
Doctors Point Beach 
Kaikai Beach 
Mapoutahi Cove 
Ryans Beach 
Sandfly Bay 
Smaills Beach 
Victory Beach 
Warrington Beach 
Whareakeake (Murdering Beach)

Southland Region 
Whakaputa Beach

Invercargill 
North Beach

Clubs 
Auckland Counties Sun Club, Auckland
Auckland Naturist Orewa, Auckland
Auckland Outdoor Naturist Club, Auckland
Autumn Farm, Golden Bay
Bay of Plenty Sun Club, Whakatāne
Guysers Gaystay B&B (for men), Rotorua
Hawkes Bay Outdoor Leisure Club, Napier
Katikati Naturist Park, Bay of Plenty
Manawatu Naturist Club, Oroua Downs, Manawatu District
Nelson Sun Club, Nelson
Orchard Sun Club, Sutton, Dunedin
Pineglades Naturist Club, Rolleston
Rotota Sun Club, Rotorua
South Canterbury Sun Club, Geraldine
Southern Naturally, Invercargill
Wai-natur Naturist Park, Blenheim
Wellington Naturist Club, Te Mārua, Upper Hutt
Woodside Park/Waikato Outdoor Society, Hamilton

United States

Hawaii 

Nude beaches can be found on Hawaii's four largest islands. Some are officially designated as nude beaches, while others officially forbid nudity but tolerate it in practice.

Oahu
 Sand Island is an island within Honolulu on the island of Oahu. On the small island, accessible by causeway, at the southwestern most point, is a small secluded beach that is often frequented by nudists. Nudity is illegal at Sand Island due to a state park rule against nudity.
 Polo Beach in Makaleha City and County Park on the North Shore of Oahu has an clothing optional area.  Look for a white rail fence on Farrington Highway right or ocean side about four miles west of Haleiwa, north shore. Park there. When entering the beach area from the dirt access trail from highway where park rules sign is walk RIGHT (NOT left) on the beach for clothing optional.  Signage prohibiting nudity was removed in 2016.

Hawai‘i (Big Island)
 Kehena (“Dolphin Beach”) is a black sand beach in the Puna District of the island of Hawai‘i.
 Hangin’ Loose Clothing-Optional Retreat & Botanical Gardens is a thirty-minute drive from Kehena in the Puna District of the Island of Hawai‘i, the “Big Island.”

Maui
 Little Mākena Beach. A sign forbidding nudity was erected in 2021 as the beach is in a state park where nudity is illegal. Nevertheless nudism remains common here.  Located in Mākena State Park, Maui.
 Red Sand Beach near Hāna
 Slaughterhouse Beach in Hana Highway on Maui

Kaua‘i
 Kauapea Beach on Kaua‘i. The English name is Secret Beach. Walk along the sand east, towards the light house on the cliff, until you reach Third and Fourth Beaches. There are "showers", outpourings of water from the rock wall between Second and Third Beaches where you can shower.
 Donkey Beach on Kaua‘i was a clothing-optional beach, but recent development of a coastal bike path means it is no longer secluded and used by nudists. Hawaii is a topfree state, there has never been a law against topfree sunbathing at NON state park beaches like this one. It IS illegal at state park beaches.
 Larsen's Beach on Kaua‘i This is the primary clothing-optional Beach on Kauai. The Hawaiian name is Lepeuli.

Notes

References

External links
Sydney Nudist Information
Free Beaches Australia
Australian Nude Beaches on Google Maps

Oceania
Oceania

Beaches of Australia
Beaches of New Zealand
Oceania-related lists
Lists of places